The relationship between religion and schizophrenia is of particular interest to psychiatrists because of the similarities between religious experiences and psychotic episodes; religious experiences often involve auditory and/or visual phenomena, and those with schizophrenia commonly report hallucinations and delusions that may resemble the events found within a religious experience. In general, religion has been found to have "both a protective and a risk increasing effect" for schizophrenia.

A common report from those with schizophrenia is some type of religious belief that many medical practitioners consider to be delusional – such as the belief they are divine beings or prophets, that a god is talking to them, they are possessed by demons, etc. Active and adaptive coping skills in subjects with residual schizophrenia are associated with a sound spiritual, religious, or personal belief system.

Trans-cultural studies have found that such beliefs are much more common in patients who also identify as Christian and/or reside in predominately Christian areas such as Europe or North America.  By comparison, patients in Japan much more commonly have delusions surrounding matters of shame and slander, and in Pakistan matters of paranoia regarding relatives and neighbors.

Background

Schizophrenia is a complex psychotic disorder in which symptoms include emotional blunting, intellectual deterioration, social isolation, disorganized speech and behavior, delusions, and hallucinations. The causes of schizophrenia are unclear, but it seems that genetics play a heavy role, as individuals with a family history are far more likely to suffer from schizophrenia.   The disorder can be triggered and exacerbated by social and environmental factors, with episodes becoming more apparent in periods of high stress. Neurologists have found that the schizophrenic brain has larger ventricles (fluid-filled cavities) compared to a non-schizophrenic brain. This is hypothesized to be due to loss of nerve cells. Symptoms usually appear around the onset of early adulthood.  It is rare for a child to be diagnosed with schizophrenia, in part because of the difficulty in establishing what erroneous thoughts and beliefs can be attributed to childhood development and which thoughts and beliefs can be attributed to schizophrenia. With psychiatric medication (usually antipsychotics) and therapy, individuals with schizophrenia can live successful and productive lives.

Role of religion in schizophrenia treatment 

It has been shown in longitudinal studies that those suffering from schizophrenia have varying degrees of success when religion plays a significant role in their recovery.  It would seem that the use of religion can either be a helpful method of coping with the disorder, or it can be a significant hindrance in recovery. Especially for those who are active in a religious community, religion can also be a very valuable tool in coping with the disorder.  It can be difficult, however, to distinguish if a religious experience is genuine to the spiritual person, or if it is a positive symptom of the illness. This is where a skilled and reliable therapist can help. Provided that a therapist is open to the use of religion in one's treatment, and that the patient is open and receiving said treatment, it is entirely possible to tie religion in with professional therapeutic aids and medication in order to meet a desirable goal. Those who are involved in their church and are spiritual on a daily basis, while getting psychiatric treatment have reported fewer symptoms and a better quality of life. They learn to see their religion as a source of hope rather than a tormenting reality.

Religion as a trigger for schizophrenia 
Schizophrenia can be triggered by a variety of environmental factors, including significant stress, intensely emotional situations, and disturbing or uncomfortable experiences. It is possible that religion can sometimes be a trigger for schizophrenia in those who are vulnerable; religious imagery is often very grandiose, and beckons a large personal change within an individual. This could potentially lead to a psychotic episode due to the shift in realistic thinking; a sufferer may believe that they themselves are a deity or messiah, or that a god is speaking to them. These symptoms may cause violent behavior, either toward others or themselves. In some instances, they may also experience more distress-inducing symptoms if they believe that a god is using their illness as a punishment. The patient may refuse treatment based on religious beliefs; in certain instances, one might believe that their delusions and hallucinations are actually a divine experience, and therefore deny any treatment.

See also
 God complex
 Jerusalem syndrome
 Mental health of Jesus
 Messiah complex
 Paranoid schizophrenia
 Psychology of religion
 Religious delusion
 The Three Christs of Ypsilanti
 Terry A. Davis

References 

Psychology of religion
Schizophrenia
Religion and mental health